Upper Providence Township, Pennsylvania may refer to:

Upper Providence Township, Delaware County, Pennsylvania
Upper Providence Township, Montgomery County, Pennsylvania

See also
East Providence Township, Bedford County, Pennsylvania
Lower Providence Township, Montgomery County, Pennsylvania
Nether Providence Township, Delaware County, Pennsylvania
West Providence Township, Bedford County, Pennsylvania
Providence Township, Pennsylvania (disambiguation)

Pennsylvania township disambiguation pages